Xenisthmus semicinctus, the halfbelt wriggler, is a species of fish in the wriggler family, Xenisthmidae, which is regarded as a synonymous with the Eleotridae,.

Distribution
Rowley Shoals, Timor Sea.

References

semicinctus
Fish described in 2004